Charles A. Wyrick is an American politician from the U.S. state of Oklahoma. He served in the Oklahoma Senate, representing District 1, which includes Craig, Delaware and Ottawa counties. He served as Democratic whip. He was re-elected in 2008 and 2012. He was forced to retire in 2016 due to term limits set forth in the Oklahoma Constitution.
 
Wyrick started his family dairy in 1980 and is currently raising dairy cows. In 1990, he started a heavy equipment contracting business specializing in soil conservation work. He served on the board of directors of the Ottawa County Conservation District from 1999 through 2004.

Political career
Charles Wyrick was elected to office in 2004 and authored legislation in his first term to require convicted sex offenders to wear a Global Positioning system upon their release from incarceration.

After the 2006 election, Republicans and Democrats held an equal number of seats in the Oklahoma Senate and Wyrick was elected as the Democratic co-floor leader of the Senate, who shared power with a Republican co-floor leader.

In 2012, after the Republican-led Oklahoma Legislature redrew district lines, Wyrick won re-election after his sole opponent dropped out of the race.

Wyrick served as the Democratic caucus as an assistant floor leader.

References

External links
Senator Charles Wyrick - District 1 official State Senate website
Project Vote Smart - Charles Wyrick (OK) profile
Follow the Money - Charles A Wyrick
2008 2006 2004 campaign contributions

Living people
Democratic Party Oklahoma state senators
People from Fairland, Oklahoma
1959 births
21st-century American politicians